This is a list of notable individuals who research complex networks, including social networks, biological networks, and semantic networks, among others. Individuals are categorized based on their background and training, or their area of focus.

Social and behavioral sciences
 Peter Bearman
 Ronald S. Burt
 Noshir Contractor
 James Fowler
 Mark Granovetter
 Dirk Helbing
 Matthew O. Jackson
 Helen Hall Jennings
 Frigyes Karinthy
 David Lazer
 Zeev Maoz
 John Levi Martin
 James D. Montgomery
 Anna Nagurney
 Kim Rossmo
 Tom Snijders
 Duncan Watts
 Barry Wellman
 Douglas R. White
 Harrison White

Computer & Information sciences
 Lada Adamic
 Vladimir Batagelj
 Randy Bush
 Aaron Clauset
 Anuška Ferligoj
 Jon Kleinberg
 Jure Leskovec
 Filippo Menczer
 Cristopher Moore
 Aleš Žiberna

Physics
 Réka Albert
 Luís A. N. Amaral
 Albert-László Barabási
 Kevin E. Bassler
 Dirk Brockmann
 Kim Christensen
 Raissa D'Souza
 Ernesto Estrada
 Michelle Girvan
 Shlomo Havlin
 César Hidalgo
 Vito Latora
 José Fernando Ferreira Mendes
 Yamir Moreno
 Adilson E. Motter
 Mark Newman
 H. Eugene Stanley
 Alessandro Vespignani
 Lenka Zdeborová

Biology
 Uri Alon
 Danielle Bassett
 Caroline Buckee
 Paulien Hogeweg
 Trey Ideker
 Jukka-Pekka Onnela
 Bernhard Palsson
 John Quackenbush
 Olaf Sporns

Mathematics
 Vincent Blondel
 Béla Bollobás
 Chris Danforth
 Peter Sheridan Dodds
 Pául Erdős
 Frank Harary
 László Lovász
 Alfréd Rényi
 Steven Strogatz
 Mason Porter

Network Scientists

N